Pascal Pereira-Leal (born 5 November 1982) is a former French para table tennis player who played in international level events. He is a 2012 Paralympic bronze medalist, 2014 World champion and four-time European medalist.

References

External links 
 
 

1982 births
Living people
People from Ermont
Paralympic table tennis players of France
Table tennis players at the 2012 Summer Paralympics
Table tennis players at the 2016 Summer Paralympics
Medalists at the 2012 Summer Paralympics
French male table tennis players
Paralympic medalists in table tennis
Paralympic bronze medalists for France
20th-century French people
21st-century French people